Syllepte iophanes is a moth in the family Crambidae. It was described by Edward Meyrick in 1894. It is found on Borneo, Sulawesi, in China, Thailand and Cambodia.

References

Moths described in 1894
iophanes
Moths of Asia
Taxa named by Edward Meyrick